An Ceathrú Póilí (founded 1983) is an independent bookstore based in Cultúrlann McAdam Ó Fiaich on the Falls Road in Belfast's Gaeltacht Quarter. The shop primarily sells Irish language books and Irish traditional music recordings and also sells several hundred English-language books on the topics of Irish history and politics. An Ceathrú Póilí also sells Irish musical instruments, Celtic jewelry and craft.

History

1983–2010
An Ceathrú Póilí was founded in 1983 and was housed in Ardscoil Bhéal Feirste. After the Ardscoil was destroyed by fire in a 1984, the shop had a nomadic existence until the founding of Cultúrlann McAdam Ó Fiaich in 1991 in the old Broadway Presbyterian Church on Falls Road. The centre was used as an Irish-medium secondary school (now Coláiste Feirste) and theatre space with the book shop located on the ground floor with An Caifé Glas (now known as Bia).

2011–present
An Ceathrú Póilí was renovated in 2011 with Irish president Mary McAleese re-opening the cultural centre in 2011. The shop began selling online in September 2016. It hosts regular book launches in collaboration with publishers Coiscéim, Cló Iar-Chonnacht and An Gúm.

References

External links
An Ceathrú Póilí – official website.
An Ceathrú Póilí – Facebook page

1983 establishments in Northern Ireland
Book selling websites
Bookstores established in the 20th century
Poili
Bookshops of the United Kingdom
Independent bookshops of the United Kingdom
Irish language
Retail companies established in 1983
Retail companies of Northern Ireland